Haftkel County is in Khuzestan province, Iran. The capital of the county is the city of Haftkel. At the 2006 census, the region's population (as Haftkel District of Ramhormoz County) was 22,633 in 4,711 households. The following census in 2011 counted 22,391 people in the newly formed Haftkel County, in 5,387 households. At the 2016 census, Haftkel County's population was 22,119 in 5,908 households.

Administrative divisions

The population history and structural changes of Haftkel County's administrative divisions over three consecutive censuses are shown in the following table. The latest census shows two districts, three rural districts, and one city.

References

 

Counties of Khuzestan Province